Kodi Burns (born December 24, 1988) is an American football coach who is the wide receivers coach for the New Orleans Saints of the National Football League (NFL). He was previously the wide receivers coach at the University of Tennessee and Auburn University, where he played college football first as a quarterback and later as a wide receiver winning a national championship in 2010.

High school career
As a high school senior in 2007 at Northside High School in Fort Smith, Arkansas, Burns accounted for 2,738 yards 36 touchdowns, rushing and passing. He was named All-State by the Arkansas Activities Association and was ranked as the nation's #8 "Dual-Threat" quarterback by Rivals.com.
Burns was recruited heavily by Tommy Tuberville while he was the coach at Auburn and by Gus Malzahn while he was at Arkansas.
Malzahn would later be his coach at Auburn and on Malzahn's coaching staff at Arkansas State.

College career
Burns was a key part in Tommy Tuberville's offense in 2007. In the 2007 Chick-fil-A Bowl, Burns ran for a 10-yard touchdown to win in OT for a 23–20 win. After the game Burns was projected by media and fans to be the starter in 2008, because 2007 was Brandon Cox's senior year. Burns started seven games at quarterback for the Tigers in 2008. He was moved to wide receiver prior to the 2009 season.
Burns ran for a touchdown in the wildcat against Arkansas State; Auburn won the game 56–26. Against Ole Miss, Burns was in the wildcat and threw a touchdown pass to Cam Newton. Burns also had a key reception in the National Championship Game against Oregon. Newton found Burns on a long 35 yard touchdown pass, where Burns put Auburn up 7–3 which led to Auburn's win 22–19.

Coaching career
In January 2012, Kodi Burns joined Gus Malzahn's staff at Arkansas State as an offensive graduate assistant.

Gus Malzahn was hired to be the Auburn head coach after Auburn went 3-9 (0-8), the worst since a 3-8 1998 season. Burns returned to his alma mater as a graduate assistant on Malzahn's staff.

On May 12, 2014, it was announced that Burns would coach running backs at Samford University in Birmingham, Alabama

On February 10, 2015, Burns was hired as the wide receivers coach at Middle Tennessee State University

On January 4, 2016, it was announced Burns will be coaching the running backs at Arizona State University

On February 15, 2016 it, was announced that Burns had been hired on as Gus Malzahn's WR coach at Auburn University, replacing 
Dameyune Craig nearly 24 hours after Craig's official departure to Louisiana State University (LSU).

On December 13, 2020, it was announced that Auburn head coach Malzahn was being fired, along with his entire staff (including Burns).

On February 8, 2021,  Burns was hired as the wide receivers coach at The University of Tennessee.

On February 21, 2022, Burns was hired for his first NFL coaching role, becoming the wide receivers coach for the New Orleans Saints.

References

External links
 Samford Bulldogs bio
 Auburn Tigers bio

1988 births
Living people
American football quarterbacks
American football wide receivers
Arkansas State Red Wolves football coaches
Auburn Tigers football coaches
Auburn Tigers football players
Samford Bulldogs football coaches
Sportspeople from Fort Smith, Arkansas
UCF Knights football coaches
Players of American football from Arkansas
African-American coaches of American football
African-American players of American football
21st-century African-American sportspeople
20th-century African-American people
New Orleans Saints coaches